Suffolk is a ceremonial county of England in East Anglia. It borders Norfolk to the north, Cambridgeshire to the west and Essex to the south; the North Sea lies to the east. The county town is Ipswich; other important towns include Lowestoft, Bury St Edmunds, Newmarket, and Felixstowe which has one of the largest container ports in Europe.

The county is low-lying but can be quite hilly, especially towards the west. It is also known for its extensive farming and has largely arable land with the wetlands of the Broads in the north. The Suffolk Coast & Heaths and Dedham Vale are both nationally designated Areas of Outstanding Natural Beauty.

History

Administration

The Anglo-Saxon settlement of Suffolk, and East Anglia generally, occurred on a large scale, possibly following a period of depopulation by the previous inhabitants, the Romanised descendants of the Iceni. By the fifth century, they had established control of the region. The Anglo-Saxon inhabitants later became the "north folk" and the "south folk", from which developed the names "Norfolk" and "Suffolk". Suffolk and several adjacent areas became the kingdom of East Anglia, which later merged with Mercia and then Wessex.

Suffolk was originally divided into four separate Quarter Sessions divisions. In 1860, the number of divisions was reduced to two. The eastern division was administered from Ipswich and the western from Bury St Edmunds. Under the Local Government Act 1888, the two divisions were made the separate administrative counties of East Suffolk and West Suffolk; Ipswich became a county borough. A few Essex parishes were also added to Suffolk: Ballingdon-with-Brundon and parts of Haverhill and Kedington.

On 1 April 1974, under the Local Government Act 1972, East Suffolk, West Suffolk, and Ipswich were merged to form the unified county of Suffolk. The county was divided into several local government districts: Babergh, Forest Heath, Ipswich, Mid Suffolk, St Edmundsbury, Suffolk Coastal, and Waveney. This act also transferred some land near Great Yarmouth to Norfolk. As introduced in Parliament, the Local Government Act would have transferred Newmarket and Haverhill to Cambridgeshire and Colchester from Essex; such changes were not included when the act was passed into law.

In 2007, the Department for Communities and Local Government referred Ipswich Borough Council's bid to become a new unitary authority to the Boundary Committee. The Boundary Committee consulted local bodies and reported in favour of the proposal. It was not, however, approved by the Secretary of State for Communities and Local Government.

Beginning in February 2008, the Boundary Committee again reviewed local government in the county, with two possible options emerging. One was that of splitting Suffolk into two unitary authorities – Ipswich and Felixstowe and Rural Suffolk; and the other, that of creating a single county-wide controlling authority – the "One Suffolk" option. In February 2010, the then-Minister Rosie Winterton announced that no changes would be imposed on the structure of local government in the county as a result of the review, but that the government would be: "asking Suffolk councils and MPs to reach a consensus on what unitary solution they want through a countywide constitutional convention". Following the May 2010 general election, all further moves towards any of the suggested unitary solutions ceased on the instructions of the incoming Coalition government. In 2018 it was determined that Forest Heath and St Edmundsbury would be merged to form a new West Suffolk district, while Waveney and Suffolk Coastal would similarly form a new East Suffolk district. These changes took effect on 1 April 2019.

Archaeology

West Suffolk, like nearby East Cambridgeshire, is renowned for archaeological finds from the Stone Age, the Bronze Age, and the Iron Age. Bronze Age artefacts have been found in the area between Mildenhall and West Row, in Eriswell and in Lakenheath.
Many bronze objects, such as swords, spearheads, arrows, axes, palstaves, knives, daggers, rapiers, armour, decorative equipment (in particular for horses), and fragments of sheet bronze, are entrusted to St. Edmundsbury heritage service, housed at West Stow just outside Bury St. Edmunds. Other finds include traces of cremations and barrows.

In the east of the county is Sutton Hoo, the site of one of England's most significant Anglo-Saxon archaeological finds, a ship burial containing a collection of treasures including a sword of state, helmet, gold and silver bowls, jewellery and a lyre.

In 1992 a famous hoard of late Roman gold and silver was discovered in the village of Hoxne. It is still the largest hoard of its kind to have been discovered in Britain.

While carrying out surveys before installing a pipeline in 2014, archaeologists for Anglian Water discovered nine skeletons and four cremation pits, at Bardwell, Barnham, Pakenham and Rougham, all near Bury St Edmunds. Neolithic, Bronze Age, Iron Age, Roman and medieval items were also unearthed, along with the 9 skeletons believed to be of the late or post-Roman era (AD 300–500). Experts said the 5-month project had recovered enough artefacts to fill half a shipping container, and that the discoveries had shed new light on their understanding of the development of small rural communities.

A number of 6th century Anglo-Saxon "grub huts" were also found nearby, which are believed to be cellars beneath Saxon buildings.

In 2019, an excavation of a 4th-century Roman cemetery in Great Whelnetham uncovered unusual burial practices. Of 52 skeletons were found, a large number had been decapitated, which archaeologists claimed gave new insight in to Roman traditions. The burial ground includes the remains of men, women and children who likely lived in a nearby settlement. The fact that up to 40% of the bodies were decapitated represents "quite a rare find".

A survey in 2020 named Suffolk the third best place in the UK for aspiring archaeologists, and showed that the area was especially rich in finds from the Roman period, with over 1500 objects found in the preceding year.

In July 2020, metal detectorist Luke Mahoney, found 1061 silver hammered coins estimated to be worth £100,000 in Ipswich. The coins dated back to the 15th–17th century, according to experts.

In September 2020, archaeologists announced the discovery of an Anglo-Saxon cemetery with 17 cremations and 191 burials dating back to the 7th century in Oulton, near Lowestoft. The graves contained the remains of men, women and children, as well as artefacts including small iron knives and silver pennies, wrist clasps, strings of amber and glass beads. According to Andrew Peachey, who carried out the excavations, the skeletons had mostly vanished because of the highly acidic soil. They, fortunately, were preserved as brittle shapes and "sand silhouettes" in the sand.

Suffolk Pink
Villages and towns in Suffolk are renowned for historic pink-washed halls and cottages, which has become known far and wide as "Suffolk Pink". Decorative paint colours found in the county can range from a pale shell shade, to a deep blush brick colour.

According to research, Suffolk Pink dates back to the 14th century, where these shades were developed by local dyers by adding natural substances to a traditional limewash mix. Additives used in this process include pig or ox blood with buttermilk, elderberries and sloe juice.

Locals and historians often state that a true Suffolk Pink should be a "deep dusky terracotta shade", rather than the more popular pastel hue of modern times. This has caused controversy in the past when home and business-owners alike have been reprimanded for using colours deemed incorrect, with some being forced to repaint to an acceptable shade. In 2013, famous chef Marco Pierre White had his 15th century hotel, The Angel, in Lavenham, decorated a shade of pink that was not traditional Suffolk Pink. He was required by local authorities to repaint.

In another example of Suffolk taking its colours seriously, a home-owner in Lavenham was obligated to paint their Grade 1 listed cottage Suffolk Pink, to make it match a neighbouring property. The local council said it wanted all of the cottages on that particular part of the road to be the same colour, because they were a single building historically (300 years earlier).

County landmarks that are painted Suffolk Pink include the cottages in front of St Mary's Church in the village of Cavendish.

The historic Suffolk Pink colour has also inspired the name of a British apple.

Geography
Located in the East of England, much of Suffolk is low-lying, founded on Pleistocene sand and clays. These rocks are relatively unresistant and the coast is eroding rapidly. Coastal defences have been used to protect several towns, but several cliff-top houses have been lost to coastal erosion and others are under threat. The continuing protection of the coastline and the estuaries, including the Blyth, Alde and Deben, has been, and remains, a matter of considerable discussion.

The coastal strip to the East contains an area of heathland known as "The Sandlings" which runs almost the full length of the coastline. Suffolk is also home to nature reserves, such as the RSPB site at Minsmere, and Trimley Marshes, a wetland under the protection of Suffolk Wildlife Trust. The clay plateau inland, deeply intercut by rivers, is often referred to as 'High Suffolk'.

The west of the county lies on more resistant Cretaceous chalk. This chalk is responsible for a sweeping tract of largely downland landscapes that stretches from Dorset in the south west to Dover in the south east and north through East Anglia to the Yorkshire Wolds. The chalk is less easily eroded so forms the only significant hills in the county. It is the highest point of the Newmarket Ridge and is near the villages of Rede and Chedburgh.

The county flower is the oxlip.

Demography

According to estimates by the Office for National Statistics, the population of Suffolk in 2014 was 738,512, split almost evenly between males and females. Roughly 22% of the population was aged 65 or older, and 90.84% were "White British".

Historically, the county's population has mostly been employed as agricultural workers. An 1835 survey showed Suffolk to have 4,526 occupiers of land employing labourers, 1,121 occupiers not employing labourers, 33,040 labourers employed in agriculture, 676 employed in manufacture, 18,167 employed in retail trade or handicraft, 2,228 'capitalists, bankers etc.', 5,336 labourers (non-agricultural), 4,940 other males aged over 20, 2,032 male servants and 11,483 female servants. The same publication records the total population of the county at 296,304.

Most English counties have nicknames for people from that county, such as a Tyke from Yorkshire and a Yellowbelly from Lincolnshire. A traditional nicknames for people from Suffolk is 'Suffolk Fair-Maids' referring to the supposed beauty of its female inhabitants in the Middle Ages.
Another is 'Silly Suffolk', often assumed to be derived from the Old English word sælig in the meaning 'blessed' referring to the long history of Christianity in the county. However, use of the term 'Silly Suffolk' can actually be dated to no earlier than 1819, and its alleged medieval origins have been shown to be mythical.

There are several towns in the county with Ipswich being the largest and most populous. At the time of the 2011 census, a population of 730,000 lived in the county with 133,384 living in Ipswich. The table below shows all towns with over 20,000 inhabitants.

Economy 
The majority of agriculture in Suffolk is either arable or mixed. Farm sizes vary from anything around 80 acres (32 hectares) to over 8,000. Soil types vary from heavy clays to light sands. Crops grown include winter wheat, winter barley, sugar beet, oilseed rape, winter and spring beans and linseed, although smaller areas of rye and oats can be found growing in areas with lighter soils along with a variety of vegetables.

The continuing importance of agriculture in the county is reflected in the Suffolk Show, which is held annually in May at Ipswich. Although latterly somewhat changed in nature, this remains primarily an agricultural show.

Well-known companies in Suffolk include Greene King and Branston Pickle in Bury St Edmunds. Birds Eye has its largest UK factory in Lowestoft, where all its meat products and frozen vegetables are processed. Huntley & Palmers biscuit company has a base in Sudbury. The UK horse racing industry is based in Newmarket. There are two USAF bases in the west of the county close to the A11. Sizewell B nuclear power station is at Sizewell on the coast near Leiston. Bernard Matthews Farms have some processing units in the county, specifically Holton. Southwold is the home of Adnams Brewery. The Port of Felixstowe is the largest container port in the United Kingdom. Other ports are at Lowestoft and Ipswich, run by Associated British Ports. BT has its main research and development facility at Martlesham Heath.

Below is a chart of regional gross value added of Suffolk at current basic prices published by Office for National Statistics with figures in millions of British Pounds Sterling.

Education

Primary, secondary and further education 
Suffolk has a comprehensive education system with fourteen independent schools. Unusually for the UK, some of Suffolk had a 3-tier school system in place with primary schools (ages 5–9), middle schools (ages 9–13) and upper schools (ages 13–16). However, a 2006 Suffolk County Council study concluded that Suffolk should move to the 2-tier school system used in the majority of the UK. For the purpose of conversion to 2-tier, the 3-tier system was divided into 4 geographical area groupings and corresponding phases. The first phase was the conversion of schools in Lowestoft and Haverhill in 2011, followed by schools in north and west Suffolk in 2012. The remainder of the changeovers to 2-tier took place from 2013, for those schools that stayed within Local government control, and did not become Academies and/or free schools. The majority of schools thus now (2019) operate the more common primary to high school (11–16).

Many of the county's upper schools have a sixth form and most further education colleges in the county offer A-level courses. In terms of school population, Suffolk's individual schools are large with the Ipswich district with the largest school population and Forest Heath the smallest, with just two schools. In 2013, a letter said that "...nearly a fifth of the schools inspected were judged inadequate. This is unacceptable and now means that Suffolk has a higher proportion of pupils educated in inadequate schools than both the regional and national averages."

The Royal Hospital School near Ipswich is the largest independent boarding school in Suffolk. Other boarding schools within Suffolk include Barnardiston Hall Preparatory School, Culford School, Finborough School, Framlingham College, Ipswich High School, Ipswich School, Orwell Park School, Saint Felix School and Woodbridge School.

The Castle Partnership Academy Trust in Haverhill is the county's only All-through Academy Chain. Comprising Castle Manor Academy and Place Farm Primary Academy, the Academy Trust supports all-through education and provides opportunities for young people aged 3 to 18.

Sixth form colleges in the county include Lowestoft Sixth Form College and One in Ipswich. Suffolk is home to four further education colleges: Lowestoft College, Easton & Otley College, Suffolk New College (Ipswich) and West Suffolk College (Bury St Edmunds).

Tertiary education
The county has one university, with branches spread across different towns. University of Suffolk was, prior to August 2016, known as University Campus Suffolk. Up until it became independent it was a collaboration between the University of Essex and the University of East Anglia which sponsored its formation and validated its degrees. UOS accepted its first students in September 2007. Until then Suffolk was one of only four counties in England which did not have a university campus. The University of Suffolk was granted Taught Degree Awarding Powers by the Quality Assurance Agency for Higher Education in November 2015, and in May 2016 it was awarded University status by the Privy Council and renamed The University of Suffolk on 1 August 2016.

The university operates at five sites with its central hub in Ipswich. Others include Lowestoft, Bury St. Edmunds, and Great Yarmouth in Norfolk. The university operates two academic faculties and in  had  students. Some 30% of the student body are classed as mature students and 68% of university students are female.

Culture

Arts

Founded in 1948 by Benjamin Britten, the annual Aldeburgh Festival is one of the UK's major classical music festivals. Originating in Aldeburgh, it has been held at the nearby Snape Maltings since 1967. Since 2006, Henham Park, has been home to the annual Latitude Festival. This mainly open-air festival, which has grown considerably in size and scope, includes popular music, comedy, poetry and literary events. The FolkEast festival is held at Glemham Hall in August and attracts international acoustic, folk and roots musicians whilst also championing local businesses, heritage and crafts. In 2015 it was also home to the first instrumental festival of musical instruments and makers. More recently, LeeStock Music Festival has been held in Sudbury. A celebration of the county, "Suffolk Day", was instigated in 2017.

Dialect
The Suffolk dialect is very distinctive. Epenthesis and yod-dropping is common, along with non-conjugation of verbs.

Sport

Football
The county's sole professional football club is Ipswich Town. Formed in 1878, the club were Football League champions in 1961–62, FA Cup winners in 1977–78 and UEFA Cup winners in 1980–81; as of the 2022–23 season, Ipswich Town play in League One, the third tier of English football. The club has as part of its crest the Suffolk Punch, a now endangered breed of draught horse native to the county. The next highest ranked teams in Suffolk are Leiston and Needham Market, who both participate in the Southern League Premier Division Central, the seventh tier of English football.

Horse racing
The town of Newmarket is the headquarters of British horseracing – home to the largest cluster of training yards in the country and many key horse racing organisations including the National Stud, and Newmarket Racecourse. Tattersalls bloodstock auctioneers and the National Horseracing Museum are also in the town. Point to point racing takes place at Higham and Ampton.

Speedway
Speedway racing has been staged in Suffolk since at least the 1950s, following the construction of the Foxhall Stadium, just outside Ipswich, home of the Ipswich Witches. The Witches are currently members of the Premier League, the UK's first division. National League team Mildenhall Fen Tigers are also from Suffolk.

Cricket
Suffolk C.C.C. compete in the Eastern Division of the Minor Counties Championship. The club has won the championship three times outright and has shared the title one other time as well as winning the MCCA Knockout Trophy once. Home games are played in Bury St Edmunds, Copdock, Exning, Framlingham, Ipswich and Mildenhall.

Suffolk in popular culture

Novels set in Suffolk include parts of David Copperfield by Charles Dickens, The Fourth Protocol, by Frederick Forsyth, Unnatural Causes by P.D. James, Dodie Smith's The Hundred and One Dalmatians, The Rings of Saturn by W. G. Sebald, and among Arthur Ransome's children's books, We Didn't Mean to Go to Sea, Coot Club and Secret Water take place in part in the county. Roald Dahl's short story "The Mildenhall Treasure" is set in Mildenhall.

A TV series about a British antiques dealer, Lovejoy, was filmed in various locations in Suffolk. The reality TV series Space Cadets was filmed in Rendlesham Forest, although the producers fooled participants into believing that they were in Russia. Several towns and villages in the county have been used for location filming of other television programmes and cinema films. These include the BBC Four TV series Detectorists, an episode of Kavanagh QC, and the films Iris and Drowning by Numbers. During the period 2017–2018, a total of £3.8million was spent by film crews in Suffolk

The Rendlesham Forest Incident is one of the most famous UFO events in England and is sometimes referred to as "Britain's Roswell".

The song "Castle on the Hill" by Ed Sheeran was referred to by him as "a love letter to Suffolk", with lyrical references to his hometown of Framlingham and Framlingham Castle.

Knype Hill is the fictional name for Southwold in George Orwell's 1935 novel A Clergyman's Daughter, while the character of Dorothy Hare is modelled on Brenda Salkeld, the gym mistress at St Felix School in the early 1930s.

Richard Curtis and Danny Boyle's 2019 romantic comedy Yesterday was filmed throughout Suffolk, using  Halesworth, Dunwich, Shingle Street and Latitude Festival as locations. The television series of Anthony Horowitz's Magpie Murders was filmed extensively in Suffolk during 2021.

The 2021 film The Dig, based on the excavation of Sutton Hoo in the 1930s and starring Ralph Fiennes and Carey Mulligan was mostly shot on location.

The 2022 series "The Witchfinder" is a BBC Two sitcom based on the journey of Matthew Hopkins, the Witchfinder general, and a suspected witch through East Anglia and many Suffolk towns including Stowmarket and Framlingham during the Witch trials of the English Civil War.

Notable people 

In the arts, Suffolk is noted for having been home to two of England's best regarded painters, Thomas Gainsborough and John Constable – the Stour Valley area is branded as "Constable Country" – and one of its most noted composers, Benjamin Britten. Other artistic figures connected with Suffolk include: Sir Alfred Munnings, John Nash, sculptress Dame Elizabeth Frink, Cedric Morris who ran the East Anglian School, Philip Wilson Steer, and the cartoonist Carl Giles (a bronze statue of his character "Grandma" is located in Ipswich town centre); the poets George Crabbe and Robert Bloomfield were both born in Suffolk; farmer and writer Adrian Bell, writer and editor Ronald Blythe, V. S. Pritchett, the authors Ralph Hammond Innes and Ruth Rendell. The writer M. M. Kaye spend her last years in Suffolk and died in Lavenham. Actors Ralph Fiennes and Bob Hoskins, actress and singer Kerry Ellis, musician and record producer Brian Eno, multi-award winning singer-songwriter Ed Sheeran and sopranos Laura Wright and Christina Johnston are all connected with the county. Glam rock band and three time Brit Award winners The Darkness hail from Lowestoft.

Hip hop DJ Tim Westwood is originally from Suffolk and the influential DJ and radio presenter John Peel made the county his home. Contemporary painter Maggi Hambling, was born and resides in Suffolk. Norah Lofts, author of best-selling historical novels, lived for decades in Bury St. Edmunds. Sir Peter Hall the founder of the Royal Shakespeare Company was born in Bury St. Edmunds, and Sir Trevor Nunn the theatre director was born in Ipswich. The actor Sir John Mills spent periods of his youth in the county. The designer David Hicks lived for a number of years in Suffolk. Model Claudia Schiffer and her husband, the film director Matthew Vaughn, have owned a house in Suffolk since 2002.

Suffolk's contributions to sport include Formula One magnate Bernie Ecclestone and former England footballers Terry Butcher, Kieron Dyer and Matthew Upson. Due to Newmarket being the centre of British horse racing many jockeys have settled in the county, including Lester Piggott and Frankie Dettori. MMA fighter Arnold Allen was born in Suffolk. Fabio Wardley English heavyweight champion is also from Suffolk.

Significant ecclesiastical figures from Suffolk include Simon Sudbury, a former archbishop of Canterbury; former Lord High Chancellor Cardinal Thomas Wolsey hailed from Ipswich; and author, poet and Benedictine monk John Lydgate. Richard Hakluyt the great recorder of exploration and voyages was a clergyman in Wetheringsett. Edward FitzGerald, the first translator of the Rubaiyat of Omar Khayyam, was born in Bredfield. The abolitionists Thomas Clarkson and Richard Dykes Alexander both lived near Ipswich. The agriculturist Arthur Young had a long-standing association with the county.

Other significant persons from Suffolk include the great landscape designer Humphry Repton, suffragette Dame Millicent Garrett Fawcett; the captain of HMS Beagle, Robert FitzRoy; Witch-finder General Matthew Hopkins; educationist Hugh Catchpole; and Britain's first female physician and mayor, Elizabeth Garrett Anderson. The tuberculosis pioneer Dr. Jane Walker ran the East Anglian Sanatorium above the banks of the River Stour, and charity leader Sue Ryder settled in Suffolk and based her charity in Cavendish. The popular Victorian novelist Henry Seton Merriman lived and died in the village of Melton. Between 1932 and 1939 George Orwell lived at his parents' home in the coastal town of Southwold, where a mural of the author now dominates the entrance to Southwold Pier. He is said to have chosen his pen name from Suffolk's River Orwell. Arthur Ransome lived alongside the river during the 1930s, sailing his boats from Pin Mill and along the Shotley Peninsula.

Edmund of East Anglia
King of East Anglia and Christian martyr St Edmund (after whom the town of Bury St Edmunds is named) was killed by invading Danes in the year 869. St Edmund was the patron saint of England until he was replaced by St George in the 13th century. 2006 saw the failure of a campaign to have St Edmund named as the patron saint of England, but in 2007 he was named patron saint of Suffolk, with St Edmund's Day falling on 20 November. His flag is flown in Suffolk on that day.

Gallery

See also
List of places of interest in Suffolk
History of Suffolk
Healthcare in Suffolk
Suffolk (UK Parliament constituency)
Suffolk Police and Crime Commissioner
Suffolk Coast and Heaths
List of Lords Lieutenant of Suffolk
List of High Sheriffs of Suffolk
Suffolk Youth Orchestra

Notes

References

Further reading
William Addison, Suffolk (The County Books), Robert Hale, 1950.
Mark Bailey, Medieval Suffolk: An Economic and Social History, 1200–1500, The Boydell Press, 2007.
Adrian Bell, A Suffolk Harvest, The Bodley Head, 1956.
Adrian Bell, Corduroy, Cobden-Sanderson, 1930.
Adrian Bell, Men and the Fields, B.T. Batsford, 1939.
Ronald Blythe, Akenfield: Portrait of an English Village, Allen Lane, 1969.
Henry Munro Cautley, Suffolk Churches and their Treasures, B.T. Batsford, 1937; reprinted Boydell, 1954.
Thomas Kitson Cromwell, Excursions in the County of Suffolk, 2 vols., Longmans, 1818 & 1819.
Daniel Defoe, Tour through the Eastern Counties (1722), East Anglian Magazine ed., 1949. 
Sarah E. Doig, The A-Z of Curious Suffolk: Strange Stories of Mysteries, Crimes and Eccentrics, The History Press, 2016.
Sarah E. Doig, The Little History of Suffolk, The History Press, 2018.
Robert Halliday, Suffolk Strange But True, The History Press, 2008.
M. R. James, Suffolk and Norfolk: A Perambulation of the Two Counties with Notices of their History and their Ancient Buildings, J.M. Dent & Sons, 1930.
Allan Jobson, A Suffolk Calendar, Robert Hale, 1966; illustrated by Beryl Irving.
Allan Jobson, A Window in Suffolk, Robert Hale, 1962; illus. Beryl Irving.
Allan Jobson, Something of Old Suffolk, Robert Hale, 1978.
Allan Jobson, Suffolk Miscellany, Robert Hale, 1975.
Allan Jobson, Suffolk Remembered, Robert Hale, 1969.
Allan Jobson, Suffolk Villages, Robert Hale, 1971.
Allan Jobson, Under a Suffolk Sky, Robert Hale, 1964; illus. Beryl Irving.
D. P. Mortlock, The Guide to Suffolk Churches, Lutterworth Press, 2nd rev. ed. 2009.
Arthur Mee, Suffolk. Our Farthest East (The King's England series), Hodder and Stoughton, 1942; reprinted.
Nikolaus Pevsner, James Bettley (ed.), Suffolk: East (The Buildings of England), Yale University Press, rev. ed. 2015.
Nikolaus Pevsner, James Bettley (ed.), Suffolk: West (The Buildings of England), Yale University Press, rev. ed. 2015.
Steven Plunkett, Suffolk in Anglo-Saxon Times, The History Press, 2005.
W. M. Roberts, Lost Country Houses of Suffolk, The Boydell Press, 2010.
Eric Sandon, Suffolk Houses: A Study of Domestic Architecture, Antique Collector's Club, 1977.
Norman Scarfe, Suffolk. A Shell Guide (Shell Guides), Faber and Faber, 1960; reprinted.
Norman Scarfe, Suffolk in the Middle Ages, The Boydell Press, 2007.
Norman Scarfe, The Suffolk Landscape, Phillimore & Co., new ed. 2002.
W. G. Sebald, The Rings of Saturn, Harvill Press, English ed. 1998. 
Neil R. Storey, The Little Book of Suffolk, The History Press, 2013; 2nd ed. 2020.
Alfred Suckling, The History and Antiquities of the County of Suffolk, printed for the author, 1846.
Josephine Walpole, Suffolk Artists of the Eighteenth and Nineteenth Centuries, Antique Collector's Club, 2009.
Peter Warner, The Origins of Suffolk, Manchester University Press, 1996.
Derek Wilson, A Short History of Suffolk, B.T. Batsford, 1977.
Pip Wright, I Read it in the Local Rag: Selections from Suffolk and Norfolk Papers 1701-1900, Poppyland, 2006.

External links

 Suffolk County Council
 BBC Suffolk

 Images of Suffolk at the English Heritage Archive

 
Non-metropolitan counties
Kingdom of East Anglia
Counties of England established in antiquity